Susan Scutti is an American fiction writer, poet and journalist currently writing on medical issues for Newsweek, CNN CBS Philly and Medical Daily.

Scutti obtained her undergraduate degree from Yale University She then went on to earn a master's degree in American studies from CUNY.  As a poet she has published a volume of verse The Commute (Paper Kite Press 2011 ) and had her poems included in several anthologies, such as Aloud: Voices from the Nuyorican Poets Café (Holt Paperbacks 1994). and The Outlaw Bible of American Poetry (Thunder's Mouth Press 1999), among others.

A core member of the rag tag literary collective "the Unbearables", Scutti has works in several of their collections.

References

External links
 New York Quarterly Foundation biography

Living people
21st-century American novelists
American women novelists
American women poets
21st-century American women writers
21st-century American poets
Medical journalists
Year of birth missing (living people)